Rodrigo Javier De Paul (born 24 May 1994) is an Argentine professional footballer who plays as a midfielder or an attacking midfielder for La Liga club Atlético Madrid and the Argentina national team.

Club career

Racing Club
Born in Sarandí, Greater Buenos Aires, De Paul joined Racing Club's youth setup in 2002, aged eight. He was called up to the main squad on 24 June 2012, while still a junior, for a match against Vélez Sarsfield, but remained unused in the 1–2 home loss.

On 10 February 2013, De Paul played his first match as a professional, replacing Mauro Camoranesi in the 86th minute of a 0–3 loss at Atlético de Rafaela. He scored his first goal a month later, netting the last through a long-range shot in a 3–0 win at San Martín de San Juan.

De Paul appeared in 19 matches during the 2012–13 campaign. He then played a key part in 2013–14, featuring in 35 matches and scoring four times.

Valencia
On 9 May 2014, it was announced that Valencia CF agreed to a US$6.5 million deal for De Paul with Racing. He signed a five-year deal with Los Che on 6 June, and made his La Liga debut on 23 August under head coach Nuno Espírito Santo, replacing Paco Alcácer in the 65th minute in a 1–1 away draw against Sevilla FC, but being sent off just one minute later due to fouling Aleix Vidal.

He scored his first goal for the club on 4 December 2014 in the 2–1 win against Rayo Vallecano in the Copa del Rey. He followed this up with his first La Liga goal on 9 April 2015 against Athletic Bilbao, making 29 appearances in all competitions during his first season at the club. 

After making 14 appearances in all competitions during the first half of the 2015-16 season, including two in the Champions League. On 4 February 2016, he was loaned out by then Valencia manager Gary Neville to his former side Racing Club. He scored his first and only goal in a victory against Bolívar on 24 February in the Copa Libertadores.

Udinese
On 20 July 2016, De Paul was transferred to Italian Serie A club Udinese. He made his debut on 20 August 2016 against AS Roma in a 4–0 defeat. He scored his first goal for the club on 29 January 2017 against AC Milan in a 2–1 victory. 

He started the 2018–19 season with four goals in the first six matches of the Serie A season. He would finish the season as Udinese top goal scorer with nine goals during the 2018–19 Udinese Calcio season and also nine assists. 

On 15 October 2019, De Paul signed a new five-year contract at Udinese. He would score seven goals and gain six assists for Udinese in Serie A during the 2019–20 season.

De Paul became Udinese's club captain in December 2020, replacing Kevin Lasagna.

Atlético Madrid

On 12 July 2021, De Paul signed a five-year contract with Atlético Madrid. He joined his new club just days after winning the Copa América with Argentina. On 7 December 2021, he scored his first goal for the club in a 3–1 away win against FC Porto in the final group game of the 2021–22 UEFA Champions League.

International career
De Paul made his senior international debut for Argentina in a 4–0 victory against Iraq on 11 October 2018, and later became a regular under manager Lionel Scaloni; he was part of the Argentina squad that finished third in the Copa América 2019 after beating Chile 2–1 in the third-place match.

On 3 July 2021, De Paul scored the opening goal in a 3–0 win over Ecuador in the quarter-finals of the 2021 Copa América in Brazil. In the final of the tournament against the hosts Brazil, De Paul's long pass set up Ángel Di María to score the only goal of the match, allowing Argentina to capture their joint record 15th Copa América title and their first major international title since 2008. He was also part of the squad that won the 2022 FIFA World Cup.

Personal life 
Rodrigo's mother is of Italian descent, which earned him Italian citizenship. 

De Paul was in a relationship with Argentine model Camila Homs for twelve years. They have two children together. In January 2022, the couple confirmed that they were separating. De Paul has been in a relationship with Argentine singer Tini Stoessel since August 2022.

Career statistics

Club

International

Scores and results list Argentina's goal tally first, score column indicates score after each De Paul goal.

Honours
Argentina
FIFA World Cup: 2022
Copa América: 2021
CONMEBOL–UEFA Cup of Champions: 2022

Individual
Copa América Team of the Tournament: 2021

References

External links

Profile at the Atlético Madrid website

1994 births
Living people
Argentine people of Italian descent
People from Avellaneda Partido
Argentine footballers
Association football midfielders
Argentine Primera División players
Racing Club de Avellaneda footballers
La Liga players
Valencia CF players
Atlético Madrid footballers
Serie A players
Udinese Calcio players
Argentine expatriate footballers
Argentine expatriate sportspeople in Spain
Argentine expatriate sportspeople in Italy
Expatriate footballers in Spain
Expatriate footballers in Italy
Argentina international footballers
2019 Copa América players
2021 Copa América players
2022 FIFA World Cup players
FIFA World Cup-winning players
Copa América-winning players
Footballers from Buenos Aires